Kristopher "Kris" Wilson (born August 22, 1981) is a former American football tight end. He was drafted by the Kansas City Chiefs in the second round of the 2004 NFL Draft. He played college football at Pittsburgh. Wilson has also been a member of the Philadelphia Eagles, San Diego Chargers, and Baltimore Ravens.

Early years
Wilson attended J. P. McCaskey High School. As a senior, he won first-team All-Lancaster-Lebanon Section One honors at both linebacker and wide receiver.

He received a full scholarship to the University of Pittsburgh, graduating with a bachelor's degree in Economics. As a redshirt senior, he caught 44 receptions and led all NCAA Division 1-A tight ends with 9 receiving touchdowns, earning a spot as one of three finalists for the John Mackey Award in 2003, which is awarded to the nation's most outstanding tight end.

Wilson's mother, Deborah, is a licensed Social Worker with a master's degree from Temple University.

Professional career

Kansas City Chiefs
Kris Wilson entered the 2004 NFL Draft, and was drafted in the Second Round (61st Overall) by the Kansas City Chiefs of the National Football League. Wilson started 23 of 49 games played with the Chiefs, serving mostly as a tight end in tandem alongside Tony Gonzalez and Jason Dunn, in packages where the Chiefs used multiple tight ends. He caught 42 receptions for 345 yards and four touchdowns. While playing fullback Wilson blocked for running backs Larry Johnson and Priest Holmes, and also rushed four times for 13 yards. Wilson appeared in the 2005 NFL Wildcard Playoff game versus the Indianapolis Colts, during which he was targeted twice and caught two receptions.

San Diego Chargers
After a short stint with the Philadelphia Eagles in the 2008 offseason, Wilson signed a two-year contract with the San Diego Chargers. Wilson played the tight end position for the Chargers, alongside Antonio Gates, Brandon Manumaleuna, and Randy McMichael. Wilson caught four passes for 28 yards and two touchdowns in 2009, including a touchdown reception from Philip Rivers in the playoffs, after not catching any passes in the games he played in 2008. Wilson signed another two-year contract with the San Diego Chargers in March 2010. He had 113 yards in 2010, but was released on July 28, 2011.

Baltimore Ravens

In 2011, Wilson signed with the Baltimore Ravens after Todd Heap was released. In an AFC Divisional playoff win against the Houston Texans, Wilson caught a one-yard touchdown pass from Joe Flacco.

After football
Wilson is a graduate of UCLA School of Law, class of 2015.

References

External links

Philadelphia Eagles bio
San Diego Chargers bio

1981 births
Living people
Players of American football from Harrisburg, Pennsylvania
American football tight ends
American football fullbacks
Pittsburgh Panthers football players
Kansas City Chiefs players
Philadelphia Eagles players
San Diego Chargers players
Baltimore Ravens players